Paramushir is a volcanic island in the northern portion of Kuril Islands chain in the Sea of Okhotsk in the northwest Pacific Ocean. Its name is derived from the Ainu language, from “broad island” or “populous island”. Severo-Kurilsk, the administrative center of the Severo-Kurilsky district, is the only permanently populated settlement on Paramushir island.

Geography and geology
Geologically, Paramushir is a continuous chain of 23 volcanoes. At least five of them are active, and exceed :
It has erupted in 1690, 1853, 1859, 1933 and several times between 1957–2008.
It has erupted in 1742, 1854 and 1934.
 Karpinsky Group, (Shirokemuri-yama) with a height of  has erupted in 1957.
 Ebeko, (Chishima Iōyama) with a height of  has erupted numerous times, most recently in 1990.

Climate and flora and fauna

Paramushir has a sub-arctic climate strongly modulated by the cooling effects of the North Pacific Oyashio Current. The arboreal flora of Paramushir is consequently limited to dense, stunted copses of Siberian dwarf pine and shrubby alder. The alpine tundra which dominates the landscape produces plentiful edible mushrooms and berries, especially lingonberry, Arctic raspberry, whortleberry and crowberry. Red fox, Arctic hare and ermine are notably abundant and hunted by the inhabitants. The island also supports a population of brown bears. In the spring crested auklet nest on the island. The straits between Paramushir and Shumshu island support a notably dense population of sea otters; harbor seals are also common. North Pacific right whales, one of the rarest and the most endangered whale species are known to appear in the surrounding waters.

History

Paramushir was inhabited by the Ainu at the time of European contact. The island appears on an official map showing the territories of Matsumae Domain, a feudal domain of Edo period Japan dated 1644. Russian fur traders are known to have visited the island in 1711 and 1713, and Russian Orthodox missionaries established a church in 1747 to convert the local inhabitants. Subsequently, claimed by the Empire of Russia, sovereignty over the island was initially confirmed to be under Imperial Russia under the terms of the Treaty of Shimoda in 1855, but was transferred to the Empire of Japan per the 1875 Treaty of Saint Petersburg along with the rest of the Kuril Islands. The Japanese established a settlement, Kashiwabara, on the site of the largest Ainu village, which became the major port on the island, and a center for the commercial fishing industry. The island was administered as part of Shimushu District of Nemuro Subprefecture of Hokkaidō.

During World War II the island was strongly garrisoned by both the Imperial Japanese Army and Imperial Japanese Navy. The headquarters of the IJA 91st Infantry Division, responsible for defense of the northern Kurils, was established at Kashiwabara, and numerous coastal artillery positions and fortified bunkers were constructed in various locations around the island. In addition, the Imperial Japanese Army constructed four airfields: Kashiwabara Airfield in the northeast with Ki-43 Oscars, Kakumabestu Airfield on the southwest coast with a  runway and Ki-44 Tojos, Kitanodai Airfield on the northeast coast with a  runway, and Suribachi Airfield, an auxiliary base in the center of the south coast with two runways. The Imperial Japanese Navy had Musashi Airfield on the south-western tip of the island with two  runways, one  and another , operating a variety of aircraft as well as a radar site. These bases were subject to sporadic air raids from the US Army Air Forces and US Navy based in the Aleutian Islands from 1943 until the end of the war.

Soviet troops landed on Paramushir on August 18, 1945, during the Invasion of the Kuril Islands, and combat operations continued through August 23, ending with the surrender of the surviving members of the Japanese garrison. The Soviets forcibly deported the remaining Japanese civilian inhabitants and sent the prisoners of war to labor camps. Kashiwabara was renamed Severo-Kurilsk and the island annexed by the Soviet Union in 1946. Japan formally gave up sovereignty over the island under the terms of the San Francisco Peace Treaty of 1951.

In November 1952, Severo-Kurilsk was destroyed by the 1952 Severo-Kurilsk tsunami and was rebuilt in another location. Following the dissolution of the Soviet Union in 1990, the population of the island has decreased (2592 in 2002 census, 5180 in the 1989 census), and villages that once lined the coast are now ghost towns. This is due in part to the crash of the formerly lucrative herring fishery, to the extremely destructive tsunami of 1952, and general economic hardships in the more remote reaches of Russia since the fall of the Soviet Union. The island is now administered as part of the Sakhalin Oblast of the Russian Federation.

See also
 List of volcanoes in Russia
 List of islands of Russia
 Organization of Kita and Minami Fortresses

Notes

References
 Gorshkov, G. S. Volcanism and the Upper Mantle Investigations in the Kurile Island Arc. Monographs in geoscience. New York: Plenum Press, 1970. 
 Krasheninnikov, Stepan Petrovich, and James Greive. The History of Kamtschatka and the Kurilski Islands, with the Countries Adjacent. Chicago: Quadrangle Books, 1963.
 Rees, David. The Soviet Seizure of the Kuriles. New York: Praeger, 1985. 
 Takahashi, Hideki, and Masahiro Ōhara. Biodiversity and Biogeography of the Kuril Islands and Sakhalin. Bulletin of the Hokkaido University Museum, no. 2-. Sapporo, Japan: Hokkaido University Museum, 2004.

External links

 
 Images of Paramushir from the International Kuril Island Project (IKIP)
 
 
 
 
 
 

 
Active volcanoes
Islands of the Sea of Okhotsk
Islands of the Russian Far East
Stratovolcanoes of Russia
Islands of the Kuril Islands
Islands of Russia
Calderas of Russia
Volcanoes of the Kuril Islands
Mountains of the Kuril Islands